The Men's field hockey event for the 2010 Commonwealth Games was held at the Dhyan Chand National Stadium from 4–14 October 2010. The Gold medal was won by Australia, who won their fourth consecutive Commonwealth title, Beating India 8–0 in the final. New Zealand beat England 5–3 on penalty strokes to snatch bronze.

Umpires
Twelve umpires for the men's event were appointed by the International Hockey Federation.

Richmond Attipoe (GHA)
Will Drury (WAL)
Gareth Greenfield (NZL)
John Hrytsak (CAN)
Andrew Kennedy (ENG)
Satinder Kumar (IND)
Martin Madden (SCO)
Albert Marcano (TRI)
Tim Pullman (AUS)
Haider Rasool (PAK)
Nathan Stagno (GIB)
Peter Wright (RSA)

Results

Preliminary round

Pool A

Pool B

Fifth to tenth place classification

Ninth and tenth place

Seventh and eighth place

Fifth and sixth place

First to fourth place classification

Semi-finals

Bronze medal match

Gold medal match

Final standings

Goalscorers

References

Hockey at the 2010 Commonwealth Games